The Battle of Puente Sanpayo or Battle of San Payo (Galician: Ponte Sampaio) took place at Ponte Sampaio, Pontevedra, between 7–9 June 1809 during the Peninsular War.

Background
The Spanish campaign in early 1809 started with the Battle of Uclés.

Battle
The Spanish forces commanded by Colonel Pablo Morillo plus forces of the English army defeated the French forces of Marshall Michel Ney. Ney and his forces were forced to retreat and the French offensive to re-capture the cities of Pontevedra and Vigo was a failure. The battle marked the final evacuation of Galicia by the French army and the creation of a new front.

Aftermath
The Spanish campaign in early 1809 proceeded with the French advance in Catalonia in the Battle of Valls.

See also 
 Monument to the heroes of Puente Sampayo

Notes

References

External links
 

Battles of the Peninsular War
Battles of the Napoleonic Wars
Battles involving France
Battles involving Spain
Battles in Galicia (Spain)
1809 in Spain
Conflicts in 1809
June 1809 events
Pontevedra
History of Pontevedra